The Gibraltar women's national under-18 basketball team is a national basketball team of Gibraltar, administered by the Gibraltar Amateur Basketball Association. It represents the country in women's international under-18 basketball competitions.

The team won a gold medal at the 2018 FIBA U18 Women's European Championship Division C.

See also
Gibraltar women's national basketball team
Gibraltar women's national under-16 basketball team
Gibraltar men's national under-18 basketball team

References

External links
Archived records of Gibraltar team participations

Basketball in Gibraltar
Women's national under-18 basketball teams
Basketball